The 132nd Infantry Division (German: 132. Infanterie-Division) was a German division in World War II. It was formed on 5 October 1940 in Landshut, as part of the 11th Wave of Wehrmacht mobilization, and was destroyed in the Courland Pocket in 1945.

In May 1941 the units of this division participated in the suppression of the Serb uprising in Sanski Most in the Independent State of Croatia, a fascist puppet state created from Yugoslav territory. Following operations in the Balkans, the division participated in Operation Barbarossa as part of Army Group South. The division was held in reserve and did not see combat in the Soviet Union until July 27, 1941, near Koziatyn in Ukraine. The division was then involved in operations south of Kiev along the  Dnieper River and later was diverted to the Crimea, where it served on the Isthmus of Perekop,  Kerch Peninsula and Sevastopol front. During the Siege of Sevastopol the division captured the Fortress of Maxim Gorky. Subsequently the division was transferred to Army Group North to assault the fortified city of Leningrad due to its experience in assaulting Sevastopol. Before the attack on Leningrad could commence, called  Operation Nordlicht, the division became involved in repulsing Soviet Sinyavino offensive in August 1942. The division then spent most of the year of 1943 defending the environs around the "bottleneck": a thin strip of land located along the southern coast of Lake Ladoga that was crucial to maintaining the Siege of Leningrad. In November 1943, the division was transported by rail to the extreme southern flank of Army Group North. While stationed there it witnessed the  Destruction of Army Group Center with the commencement of the Russian summer offensive, called Operation Bagration. The division then became responsible for maintaining the link between Army Group North and what remained of Army Group Center, and to prevent the Russians from outflanking Army Group North from the south. Eventually the division was cut off from the rest of the German army in the Courland Pocket before surrendering to the Russians on 10 May, 1945. 

A personal memoir of service in the division was written by Gottlob Herbert Bidermann, in his book:In Deadly Combat: A German Soldier's Memoir of the Eastern Front Biderman was with the division for four years on the Russian Front and served in 132nd Tank Destroyer Battalion as an NCO and later as an officer in the 437th Infantry Regiment. After surrendering, he spent almost three years in Soviet captivity, as a prisoner of war.

Organization 
Structure of the division:

 Headquarters
 132nd Reconnaissance Battalion
 436th Infantry Regiment
 437th Infantry Regiment
 438th Infantry Regiment
 132nd Engineer Battalion
 132nd Artillery Regiment
 132nd Tank Destroyer Battalion
 132nd Signal Battalion
 132nd Divisional Supply Group

Commanding officers
 Generalleutnant Rudolf Sintzenich,  5 October 1940 – 11 January 1942
 General der Artillerie Fritz Lindemann, 11 January 1942 – 12 August 1943
 Generalleutnant Herbert Wagner, 12 August 1943 – 8 January 1945
 Generalmajor Rudolf Demme, 8 January – 8 May 1945

References

Infantry divisions of Germany during World War II
Military units and formations established in 1940
Military units and formations disestablished in 1945
Military units and formations of Germany in Yugoslavia in World War II